St Damian's R.C Science College is a coeducational Roman Catholic secondary school located in Ashton-under-Lyne in the English county of Greater Manchester.

Established in 1963 as St Damian's Catholic Secondary Modern School, it became a comprehensive school in later years and was also awarded Science College status. As part of the Building Schools for the Future Project a new school building constructed by Carillion was occupied May 2011. Today St Damian's is a voluntary aided school administered by Tameside Metropolitan Borough Council and the Roman Catholic Diocese of Salford.

St Damian's RC Science College offers GCSEs, BTECs and Cambridge Nationals as programmes of study for pupils. The school also has a specialism in science.

Notable former pupils
Elyes Gabel, actor
Mike Hall, politician

References

External links
St Damian's RC Science College official website

Secondary schools in Tameside
Catholic secondary schools in the Diocese of Salford
1963 establishments in England
Educational institutions established in 1963
Voluntary aided schools in England